An orthopedic cast, or simply cast, is a shell, frequently made from plaster or fiberglass, that encases a limb (or, in some cases, large portions of the body) to stabilize and hold anatomical structures—most often a broken bone (or bones), in place until healing is confirmed.  It is similar in function to a splint.

Plaster bandages consist of a cotton bandage that has been combined with plaster of paris, which hardens after it has been made wet. Plaster of Paris is calcined gypsum (roasted gypsum), ground to a fine powder by milling. When water is added, the more soluble form of calcium sulfate returns to the relatively insoluble form, and heat is produced.

2 (CaSO4·½ H2O) + 3 H2O → 2 (CaSO4.2H2O) + Heat

The setting of unmodified plaster starts about 10 minutes after mixing and is complete in about 45 minutes; however, the cast is not fully dry for 72 hours.

Current bandages of synthetic materials are often used, often knitted fiberglass bandages impregnated with polyurethane, sometimes bandages of thermoplastic. These are lighter and dry much faster than plaster bandages. However, plaster can be more easily moulded to make a snug and therefore more comfortable fit. In addition, plaster is much smoother and does not snag clothing or abrade the skin.

Cast types

Upper extremity

Upper extremity casts encase the arm, wrist, or hand. A long arm cast encases the arm from the hand to about 2 inches below the armpit, leaving fingers and thumbs free. A short arm cast, in contrast, stops just below the elbow. Both varieties may, depending on the injury and the doctor's decision, include one or more fingers or the thumb, in which case it is called a finger spica or thumb spica cast.

Lower extremity

 
Lower extremity casts are classified similarly, with a cast encasing both the foot and the leg to the hip being called a long leg cast, while a cast encasing the patient's foot, ankle and lower leg ending below the knee is referred to as a short leg cast. A walking heel may be applied for ambulation. These heels, when properly applied, elevate the toes and offer the wearer the advantage of keeping the toes out of the dirt and moisture of the street.  The walking heel provides a small contact patch for the cast and creates a fluid rocking motion during the stride as the cast can pivot easily in any direction. Similarly, a weight-bearing cast shoe (cast boot, cast sandal) can help the patient walk during convalescence.  Additionally, a castshoe can simply protect the patient's casted foot while helping to maintain better hygiene by preventing the cast from directly contacting potentially dirty or wet ground surfaces. Where the patient is not to walk on the injured limb, crutches or a wheelchair may be provided. The foot's under-sole portion of a leg cast may be extended terminating at the tip of the patient's toes, to create a rigid support that limits motion of the metatarsals in both weight bearing and non-weight bearing leg casts.  These are referred to as toeplates in the orthopedic discipline of medicine. This addition may be applied to further support and stabilize the metatarsals by limiting motion through a higher degree of immobilization, as well as protecting the toes from additional blunt force trauma. Typically leg casts with no toeplate are prescribed for injuries to the foot and metatarsals.  Ordinarily, a leg cast applied for the treatment of a stable ankle fracture would not use the toeplate design because there is no need to immobilize and limit the motion of the patient's toes.

Cylinder
In some cases, a cast may include the upper and lower arm and the elbow, but leave the wrist and hand free, or the upper and lower leg and the knee, leaving the foot and ankle free. Such a cast may be called a cylinder cast. Where the wrist or ankle is included, it may be called a long arm or long leg cast.

Body
Body casts, which cover the trunk of the body, and in some cases the neck up to or including the head (see Minerva Cast, below) or one or more limbs, are rarely used today, and are most commonly used in the cases of small children, who cannot be trusted to comply with a back brace, or in cases of radical surgery to repair an injury or other defect. A body cast that encases the trunk (with "straps" over the shoulders) is usually called a body jacket. These are often very uncomfortable.

EDF cast
An EDF (elongation, derotation, flexion) cast is used for the treatment of Infantile Idiopathic scoliosis.  This method of treatment for correction was developed by UK scoliosis specialist Min Mehta.  Scoliosis is a 3-dimensional problem that requires correction in all three planes. The EDF casting method can elongate the spine through traction, derotate the spine/pelvis, and improve lordosis and overall body shape and alignment.

EDF differs from Risser casting. EDF casts are either over or under the shoulder, and have a large mushroom opening on the front to allow for proper chest expansion. On the back, there is a small cutout on the concavity of the curve, not going past the midline. It was found that the spine became more aligned with this cutout than without, and that it helped correct rotation.

Spica cast
A cast that includes the trunk of the body and one or more limbs is a spica cast, just as is a cast that includes the "trunk" of the arm and one or more fingers or the thumb. For example, a shoulder spica includes the trunk of the body and one arm, usually to the wrist or hand. Shoulder spicas are almost never seen today, having been replaced with specialized splints and slings that provide early mobility of the injury to avoid joint stiffness after healing.

A hip spica includes the trunk of the body and one or more legs. A hip spica that covers only one leg to the ankle or foot is called a single hip spica, while one that covers both legs is a double hip spica. A one-and-a-half hip spica encases one leg to the ankle or foot and the other to just above the knee. The extent to which the hip spica covers the trunk depends greatly on the injury and the surgeon; the spica may extend only to the navel, allowing mobility of the spine and the possibility of walking with the aid of crutches, or may extend to the rib cage or even to the armpits in some rare cases. Hip spicas are common in maintaining reduction of femoral fractures and are also used for congenital hip dislocations, mostly while the child is still an infant.

In some cases, a hip spica may only extend down one or more legs to above the knee. Such casts, called pantaloon casts, are occasionally seen to immobilize an injured lumbar spine or pelvis, in which case the trunk portion of the cast usually extends to the armpits.

Mobility and hygiene
Mobility is severely restricted by the hip spica cast and walking without crutches or a walker is impossible because the hips cannot bend. There is a serious danger of falling if the patient in a hip spica cast tries to get upright to walk without assistance because they lack the ability to control their balance. Patients normally remain in a bed or rely on a reclining wheelchair or children's stroller. Children in spica casts can sometimes learn to get mobile by scooting around on skateboards, or pulling themselves across the floor. Some children even learn to walk by holding themselves up against furniture. A child in a spica cast must always be supervised and safety must always be considered when they are at a mobile phase of their healing to prevent reinjury or damage to the cast. Many spica casts have a spreader bar between the legs to help strengthen the cast and support the legs in the proper positions. It is important when moving the casted patient to not lift them by this spreader bar, as it may break and this could cause injury to the patient. To facilitate toileting or diaper changing and hygienic cleaning, an opening is created in the cast at the groin. The opening is normally referred to as the "perineal opening". It is formed either during cast application or after cast application by cutting the hole with the cast saw. The opening must then be petalled or lined to keep this area of the cast clean and dry. Because the hips cannot bend, using a toilet is difficult, if not impossible. It is therefore necessary for the patient to either use a diaper, bedpan, or catheters to manage bodily waste eliminations. Bathing must be done by sponge baths. Hair may be shampooed by using plastic wash basins under the head. To shampoo wash the hair of a child, the child can be lifted and placed on a kitchen counter top and their head held over the kitchen sink.

Other casts
The Minerva cast and the Risser cast were formerly used to protect an injured spine or as part of the treatment for a spinal deformity (see scoliosis), but are seldom seen today. The Minerva cast includes the trunk of the body (sometimes extending down only so far as the rib cage) as well as the patient's head, with openings provided for the patient's face, ears, and usually the top of the head and hair. The Risser cast was similar, extending from the patient's hips to the neck and sometimes including part of the head. Both of these casts could, with care and the doctor's permission, be walked in during convalescence. However, in some cases the Risser cast would extend into one or more pantaloons, in which case mobility was far more restricted.

Aside from the above common forms, body casts could come in nearly any size and configuration. For example, from the 1910s to the 1970s, use of a turnbuckle cast, which used metal turnbuckles to twist two halves of the cast so as to forcibly straighten the spine before surgery was common. The turnbuckle cast had no single configuration, and could be as small as a body jacket split in half, or could include the head, one or both legs to the knees or feet, or one arm to the elbow or wrist.

Despite the large size and extreme immobilization some casts, particularly those used in or before the 1970s, the popular term full body cast is something of a misnomer. The popular and media-driven conception of a massive cast encasing all four limbs, the trunk, and the head – sometimes leaving only small slits for the eyes, nose, and mouth – is a true rarity in recorded medical history, and this type of large scale cast appears more commonly in various Hollywood movies and on television shows. The term body cast (or full body cast) is sometimes casually used by laymen to describe any of a number of body or spica casts, from a simple body jacket to a more extensive hip spica.

Materials

Due to the nature of the dressing, the limb is unreachable during treatment, and the skin under the plaster becomes dry and scaly because the discarded outer skin cells are not washed or brushed off. Also, plaster of Paris casts can result in cutaneous complications including macerations, ulcerations, infections, rashes, itching, burns, and allergic contact dermatitis, which may also be due to the presence of formaldehyde within the plaster bandages. In hot weather, staphylococcal infection of the hair follicles and sweat glands can lead to severe and painful dermatitis.

Other limitations of plaster casts include their weight, which can be quite considerable, thus restricting movement, especially of a child. Removal of the cast requires destroying the cast itself. The process is often noisy, making use of a special oscillating saw that can easily cut the hard cast material but has difficulty cutting soft material like cast padding or skin. Although the removal is often painless, this can be distressing for the patient, especially children.  A cast saw can cut, abrade, or burn skin, but those results are uncommon. Additionally, plaster of Paris casts break down if patients get them wet.

Due to the limitations of plaster of Paris, surgeons have also experimented with other types of materials for use as splints. An early plastic like material was gutta-percha obtained from the latex of trees found in Malaya. It resembled rubber, but contained more resins. When dry it was hard and inelastic, but when warmed it became soft and malleable. In 1851 Utterhoeven described the use of splints made from this material for the treatment of fractures. In the 1970s, the development of fibreglass casting tape made it possible to produce a cast that was lighter and more durable than the traditional plaster cast and also resistant to water (though the bandages underneath were not) helping the patient be more active.

In the 1990s the introduction of new cast lining has meant that fiberglass casts with this liner are completely waterproof, allowing patients to bathe, shower, and swim while wearing a cast. The waterproof cast liner however adds approximately 2 to 3 more minutes to the application time of the cast and increases the cost of the cast.
Drying time, however, can be inconvenient enough to warrant a cast and bandage moisture protector. These waterproof covers allow for bathing and showering while wearing either a plaster or fiberglass cast. The waterproof cast cover stays tightly around the cast and prevents water from ever reaching it while the patient is in contact with water. The cover can easily be removed to dry, and can be re-used often.

Cast liner 
Cast liners are often cotton. Though waterproof lining material is also available.

Washable casts 
There are some washable casts like FlexiOH which provide good ventilation and maintain good skin hygiene. With this cast, patients are able to bathe and go out in the rain. These type of cast has advantages that deliver patient a better treatment than conventional cast like plaster of Paris or Fiberglass. They are the next generation orthopedic immobilization photo-curing specialty-resin technology that enables waterproof, washable, lightweight, strong and comfortable way of recovering from fractures.

Removal

Casts are typically removed by perforation using a cast saw, an oscillating saw designed to cut rigid material such as plaster or fiberglass while not harming soft tissue. Manually operated shears, patented in 1950 by Neil McKay, may be used on pediatric  or other patients who may be affected by the noise of the saw.

History
The earliest methods of holding a  reduced fracture involved using splints.  These are rigid strips laid parallel to each other alongside the bone. The Ancient Egyptians used wooden splints made of bark wrapped in linen. They also used stiff bandages for support that were probably derived from embalming techniques. The use of plaster of Paris to cover walls is evident, but it seems it was never used for bandages.   Ancient Hindus treated fractures with bamboo splints, and the writings of Hippocrates discuss management of fractures in some detail, recommending wooden splints plus exercise to prevent muscle atrophy during the immobilization.   The ancient Greeks also used waxes and resins to create stiffened bandages and the Roman Celsus, writing in AD 30, describes how to use splints and bandages stiffened with starch. Arabian doctors used lime derived from sea shells and albumen from egg whites to stiffen bandages. The Italian School of Salerno in the twelfth century recommended bandages hardened with a flour and egg mixture as did Medieval European bonesetters, who used casts made of egg white, flour, and animal fat. By the sixteenth century the famous French surgeon Ambroise Paré (1517–1590), who championed more humane treatments in medicine and promoted the use of artificial limbs, made casts of wax, cardboard, cloth, and parchment that hardened as they dried.

These methods all had merit, but the standard method for the healing of fractures was bed rest and restriction of activity. The search for a simpler, less-time-consuming, method led to the development of the first modern occlusive dressings, stiffened at first with starch and later with plaster-of-paris. The ambulatory treatment of fractures was the direct result of these innovations. The innovation of the modern cast can be traced to, among others, four military surgeons, Dominique Jean Larrey, Louis Seutin, Antonius Mathijsen, and Nikolai Ivanovich Pirogov.

Dominique Jean Larrey (1768–1842) was born in a small town in southern France. He first studied medicine with his uncle, a surgeon in Toulouse. After a short tour of duty as a naval surgeon, he returned to Paris, where he became caught up in the turmoil of the Revolution, being present at the Storming of the Bastille. From then on, he made his career as a surgeon in France's revolutionary and Napoleonic armies, which he accompanied throughout Europe and the Middle East. As a result, Larrey accumulated a vast experience of military medicine and surgery.
One of his patients after the Battle of Borodino in 1812 was an infantry officer whose arm was amputated at the shoulder. The patient was evacuated immediately following the operation and passed from Russia, through Poland and Germany. When the dressing was removed on his arrival home in France, the wound had healed. Larrey concluded that the fact that the wound had been undisturbed had facilitated healing. After the war, Larrey began stiffening bandages using camphorated alcohol, lead acetate and egg whites beaten in water.

An improved method was introduced by Louis Seutin, (1793–1865) of Brussels. In 1815 Seutin had served in the allied armies in the war against Napoleon and was on the field of Waterloo. At the time of the development of his bandage he was chief surgeon in the Belgium army. Seutin's "bandage amidonnee" consisted of cardboard splints and bandages soaked in a solution of starch and applied wet. These dressings required 2 to 3 days to dry, depending on the temperature and humidity of the surroundings. The substitution of Dextrin for starch, advocated by Velpeau, the man widely regarded as the leading French surgeon at the beginning of the 19th century, reduced the drying time to 6 hours. Although this was a vast improvement, it was still a long time, especially in the harsh environment of the battlefield.

A good description of Seutin's technique was provided by Sampson Gamgee who learned it from Seutin in France during the winter of 1851–52 and went on to promote its use in Britain. The limb was initially wrapped in wool, especially over any bony prominences. Pasteboard was then cut into shape to provide a splint, and dampened so it could be molded to the limb. The limb was then wrapped in bandages before a starch coating was applied to the outer surface. Seutin's technique for the application of the starch apparatus formed the basis of the technique used with plaster of Paris dressings today. The use of this method led to the early mobilization of patients with fractures and a marked reduction in hospital time required.

Plaster casts
Although these bandages were an improvement over Larrey's method, they were far from ideal. They required a long time to apply and dry and there was often shrinkage and distortion. A great deal of interest had been aroused in Europe around 1800 by a British diplomat, consul William Eton, who described a method of treating fractures that he had observed in Turkey. He noted that gypsum plaster (plaster of Paris) was moulded around the patient's leg to cause immobilization. If the cast became loose due to atrophy or a reduction in swelling, then additional gypsum plaster was added to fill the space. Adapting the use of plaster of Paris for use in hospitals, however, took some time. In 1828, doctors in Berlin were treating leg fractures by aligning the bones in a long narrow box, which they filled with moist sand. Substitution of plaster of Paris for the sand was the next logical step. Such plaster casts did not succeed however as the patient was confined to bed due to the casts being heavy and cumbersome.

Plaster of Paris bandages were introduced in different forms by two army surgeons, one at a peacetime home station and another on active service at the front.  Antonius Mathijsen (1805–1878) was born in Budel, the Netherlands, where his father was the village doctor. He was educated in Brussels, Maastricht and Utrecht obtaining the degree of doctor of medicine at Gissen in 1837. He spent his entire career as a medical officer in the Dutch Army. While he was stationed at Haarlem in 1851, he developed a method of applying plaster of Paris bandages. A brief note describing his method was published on January 30, 1852; it was followed shortly by more complete accounts. In these accounts Mathijsen emphasised that only simple materials were required and the bandage could be quickly applied without assistance. The bandages hardened rapidly, provided an exact fit and could be windowed or bivalved (cut to provide strain relief) easily. Mathijsen used coarsely woven materials, usually linen, into which dry plaster of Paris had been rubbed thoroughly. The bandages were then moistened with a wet sponge or brush as they were applied and rubbed by hand until they hardened.

Plaster of Paris dressings were first employed in the treatment of mass casualties in the 1850s during the Crimean War by Nikolai Ivanovich Pirogov (1810–1881). Pirogov was born in Moscow and received his early education there. After obtaining a medical degree at Dorpat (now Tartu, Estonia) he studied at Berlin and Göttingen before returning to Dorpat as a professor of Surgery. In 1840, he became the professor of surgery at the academy of military medicine in St. Petersburg. Pirogov introduced the use of ether anaesthesia to Russia and made important contributions to the study of cross-sectional human anatomy. With the help of his patron, the grand duchess Helene Pavlovna, he introduced female nurses into the military hospitals at the same time that Florence Nightingale was beginning a similar program in British military hospitals.

Seutin had travelled through Russia demonstrating his 'starched bandage', and his technique had been adopted by both the Russian army and navy by 1837. Pirogov had observed the use of plaster of Paris bandages in the studio of a sculptor who used strips of linen soaked in liquid plaster of Paris for making models (this technique, called "modroc," is still popular). Pirogov went on to develop his own methods, although he was aware of Mathijsen's work. Pirogov's method involved soaking coarse cloth in a plaster of Paris mixture immediately before application to the limbs, which were protected either by stockings or cotton pads. Large dressings were reinforced with pieces of wood.

As time passed and the method moved more into the mainstream some disagreement arose as to the problems associated with cutting off air to skin contact, and also some improvements were made. Eventually Pirogov's method gave way to Mathijsen's. Among the improvements suggested as early as 1860 was that of making the dressing resistant to water by painting the dried plaster of Paris with a mixture of shellac dissolved in alcohol. The first commercial bandages were not produced until 1931 in Germany, and were called Cellona. Before that the bandages were made by hand at the hospitals.

As a plaster cast is applied, it expands by approximately 0.5%. The less water used, the more linear expansion occurs.  Potassium sulfate can be used as an accelerator and sodium borate as a retarder to control setting time.

See also
Buddy wrapping
H. Winnett Orr, US Army surgeon who developed orthopedic plaster casts
Anne Acheson, British-Irish sculptor who, together with Elinor Hallé, invented and developed orthopedic plaster casts
Orthotics
Dental braces
Kendrick extrication device
Long spine board 
Halo (medicine)  
Cervical collar
Back brace

References

External links

 Plaster Casts & Sam's injury at The Periodic Table of Videos (University of Nottingham)

Orthopedic treatment